The 1977 African Youth Qualifying for World Cup was the first qualifying tournament into the FIFA World Youth Championship. Ivory Coast and Morocco qualified to the 1977 FIFA World Youth Championship in Tunisia.

Final round

|}

Morocco qualified after 4−0 on aggregate.

 The match was abandoned with Ivory Coast leading 3–2 after Egypt walked off to protest the awarding of a penalty against them; Ivory Coast qualified.

Qualification to World Youth Championship
The two best performing teams qualified for the 1977 FIFA World Youth Championship.

External links
Details qualifying - rsssf.com

Africa U-20 Cup of Nations
Youth Championship
1977 in youth association football